Dancesport at the 2009 Asian Indoor Games was held at Quan Ngua Sports Palace, Hanoi, Vietnam from 6 November to 7 November 2009.

Medalists

Standard

Latin

Medal table

Results

Standard

Quickstep
7 November

Semifinals

Final

Slow foxtrot
6 November

Semifinals

Final

Tango
7 November

Semifinals

Final

Viennese waltz
6 November

Semifinals

Final

Waltz
7 November

Semifinals

Final

Latin

Cha-cha-cha
7 November

Semifinals

Final

Jive
6 November

Semifinals

Final

Paso doble
6 November

Semifinals

Final

Rumba
7 November

Semifinals

Final

Samba
6 November

Semifinals

Final

References
 Official site
 Asian DanceSport Federation

2009 Asian Indoor Games events
2009
Asian